This is the discography of British-Gibraltarian singer-songwriter Albert Hammond. For information about the discography of The Family Dogg, see .

Albums

Studio albums

Live albums

Compilation albums

Singles

Notes

References

External links

Discographies of British artists
Pop music discographies